Titia Ex (born Terwinselen, November 2, 1959) is a Dutch conceptual artist. She lives and works in Amsterdam.

Work 
Ex uses light, space, and materials to create her light installations. She uses light in the widest sense possible — natural light, artificial light, plus materials that respond to light such as glass, neon, and LED — to create interactive environments.

Receiving international acclaim for her "Flower from the Universe", Ex establishes herself firmly as an LED artist Next, her "The Walk" is received well by critics and the general public wherever it is shown. "The Waiting" was selected winner in the Landscape category for the 2013 People's Choice Awards. The "Dolmen Light Tunnel" won the 2015 Lamp Lighting Solutions Award in the category Urban and Landscape Lighting.

Selected works 
 Flower from the Universe -This work established Ex as an internationally recognized artist. International broadcast station DW, Deutsche Welle English shows footage of the artwork in a televised interview with the artist broadcast in many countries of the world.
 Musical Chairs - Placed on the roof of a Kentucky Fried Chicken in Apeldoorn, Netherlands, this work embodies the creative spirit of Ex. See footage to the right.
 The Walk - An LED display in the shape of a Globe developed by Philips Color Kinetics in 2012. The work Ex created was inspired by Dante's Divine Comedy and the name of The Walk refers to Dante's travels from Hell to Purgatory and ultimately Heaven.  Among the places this work was shown was the Kinetica Art Fair in London and The New York Times wrote about Ex' contribution as "one of the most popular pieces."

 Dolmen Light Tunnel - Titia Ex receives international recognition for blending artistic and technical excellence, creating an art work that augments the traffic environment while retaining traffic safety.

References

External links 
 Ex Home Page 

1959 births
Living people
20th-century Dutch women artists
21st-century Dutch women artists
Dutch conceptual artists
Women conceptual artists
Feminist artists
Artists from Amsterdam
Dutch multimedia artists
Articles containing video clips